The 69153/69154 Umargam Road–Valsad MEMU is a MEMU train of the Indian Railways connecting  and  of Gujarat. It is currently being operated with 69153/69154 train numbers on a daily basis.

Service

69153/Umargam Road–Valsad MEMU has average speed of 38 km/hr and covers 54 km in 1 hrs 25 min.
69154/Valsad–Umargam Road MEMU has average speed of 44 km/hr and covers 54 km in 1 hrs 15 min.

Route 

Coach composition

The train consists of 20 MEMU rake coaches.

Rake sharing

The train shares its rake with 69151/69152 Valsad–Surat MEMU and 69111/69112 Surat–Vadodara MEMU.

External links 

 69153/Umargam Road–Valsad MEMU India Rail Info
 69154/Valsad–Umargam Road MEMU India Rail Info

References 

Transport in Valsad
Electric multiple units in Gujarat